The Constitution of the Cretan State was the constitution of the Cretan State, an autonomous state under Ottoman suzerainty and guaranteed by the Great Powers, encompassing the island of Crete (now in Greece). It came into effect on 8 February 1907. It remained in force until 1908, when the Cretans unilaterally proclaimed the island's union with Greece during the Bosnian Crisis. Although this act was not internationally recognized, Crete was governed thereafter according to the laws of the Kingdom of Greece, until it was formally united with Greece in December 1913, following the Balkan Wars.

Constitution
1907 in law
Political history of Greece
Constitution of Greece
1907 in Greece
1907 documents